Stephen Richards (born 26 August 1965) is a New Zealand sprint canoeist who competed in the late 1980s and early 1990s. He was eliminated in the semifinals of the K-4 1000 m event at the 1988 Summer Olympics in Seoul. Four years later in Barcelona, he was eliminated in the semifinals of the same event.

References

1965 births
Canoeists at the 1988 Summer Olympics
Canoeists at the 1992 Summer Olympics
Living people
New Zealand male canoeists
Olympic canoeists of New Zealand